St Etheldreda's Church, Norwich is a Grade I listed redundant parish church in the Church of England in Norwich.

History

The church is medieval dating from the 12th century.

After being declared redundant as a parish church, the building was used as an arts studio.

Organ

The church contained an organ which dated from 1884 by Norman and Beard. A specification of the organ can be found on the National Pipe Organ Register.

References

External links
St Etheldreda's on the European Round Tower Churches website

Etheldreda
Grade I listed buildings in Norfolk
Round towers